The Öresund or Øresund Bridge is a combined railway and motorway bridge across the Øresund strait between Denmark and Sweden. The crossing is completed by the  Drogden Tunnel from Peberholm to the Danish island of Amager.

The bridge connects the road and rail networks of the Scandinavian Peninsula with those of Central and Western Europe. A data cable also makes the bridge the backbone of Internet data transmission between central Europe and Sweden. The international European route E20 crosses via road, the Øresund Line via railway. The construction of the Great Belt Fixed Link (1988–1998), connecting Zealand to Funen and thence to the Jutland Peninsula, and the Øresund Bridge have connected Central and Western Europe to Sweden by road and rail.

The bridge was designed by Jørgen Nissen and Klaus Falbe Hansen from Ove Arup and Partners, and Niels Gimsing and Georg Rotne.

The justification for the additional expenditure and complexity related to digging a tunnel for part of the way, rather than raising that section of the bridge, was to avoid interfering with air traffic from the nearby Copenhagen Airport, to provide a clear channel for ships in good weather or bad, and to prevent ice floes from blocking the strait. Construction began in 1995, with the bridge opening to traffic on 1 July 2000. The bridge received the 2002 IABSE Outstanding Structure Award.

History
Ideas for a fixed link across the Øresund were advanced as early as the first decade of the 20th century. In 1910, proposals were put to the Swedish Parliament for a railway tunnel across the strait, which would have comprised two tunnelled sections linked by a surface road across the island of Saltholm. The concept of a bridge over the Øresund was first formally proposed in 1936 by a consortium of engineering firms who proposed a national motorway network for Denmark.

The idea was dropped during World War II, but picked up again thereafter and studied in significant detail in various Danish-Swedish government commissions through the 1950s and 1960s. However, disagreement existed regarding the placement and exact form of the link, with some arguing for a link at the narrowest point of the sound at Helsingør–Helsingborg, further north of Copenhagen, and some arguing for a more direct link from Copenhagen to Malmö. Additionally, some regional and local interests argued that other bridge and road projects, notably the then-unbuilt Great Belt Fixed Link, should take priority. The governments of Denmark and Sweden eventually signed an agreement to build a fixed link in 1973. It would have comprised a bridge between Malmö and Saltholm, with a tunnel linking Saltholm to Copenhagen, and would have been accompanied by a second rail tunnel across the Øresund between Helsingør and Helsingborg.

However, that project was cancelled in 1978 due to the economic situation, and growing environmental concerns. As the economic situation improved in the 1980s, interest continued and the governments signed a new agreement in 1991.

An OMEGA centre report identified the following as primary motivations for construction of the bridge:

 to improve transport links in northern Europe, from Hamburg to Oslo;
 regional development around the Øresund as an answer to the intensifying globalisation process and Sweden's decision to apply for membership of the European Community;
 connecting the two largest cities of the region, which were both experiencing economic difficulties;
 improving communications to Kastrup airport, the main flight transport hub in the region.

A joint venture of Hochtief, Skanska, Højgaard & Schultz and Monberg & Thorsen (the same of the previous Great Belt Fixed Link), began construction of the bridge in 1995 and completed it 14 August 1999. Crown Prince Frederik of Denmark and Crown Princess Victoria of Sweden met midway across the bridge-tunnel on 14 August 1999 to celebrate its completion. The official dedication took place on 1 July 2000, with Queen Margrethe II of Denmark and King Carl XVI Gustaf of Sweden as the hostess and host of the ceremony. Because of the death of nine people, including three Danes and three Swedes, at the Roskilde Festival the evening before, the ceremony opened with a minute of silence. The bridge-tunnel opened for public traffic later that day. On 12 June 2000, two weeks before the dedication, 79,871 runners competed in Broloppet, a half marathon from Amager, Denmark, to Skåne, Sweden.

Despite two schedule setbacks – the discovery of 16 unexploded World War II bombs on the seafloor and an inadvertently skewed tunnel segment – the bridge-tunnel was finished three months ahead of schedule.

Although traffic between Denmark and Sweden increased by 61 percent in the first year after the bridge opened, traffic levels were not as high as expected, perhaps due to high tolls. However, since 2005, traffic levels have increased rapidly. This may be due to Danes buying homes in Sweden to take advantage of lower housing prices in Malmö and commuting to work in Denmark. In 2012, to cross by car cost DKK 310, SEK 375 or €43, with discounts of up to 75% available to regular users. In 2007, almost 25 million people travelled over the Øresund Bridge: 15.2 million by car and bus and 9.6 million by train. By 2009, the figure had risen to 35.6 million by car, coach or train.

Link features

Bridge

At , the bridge covers half the distance between Sweden and the Danish island of Amager, the border between the two countries being  from the Swedish end. The structure has a mass of 82,000 tonnes and supports two railway tracks beneath four road lanes in a horizontal girder extending along the entire length of the bridge. On both approaches to the three cable-stayed bridge sections, the girder is supported every  by concrete piers. A girder and cable-stayed design was chosen to provide the specific rigidity necessary to carry heavy rail traffic, and also to resist large accumulations of ice.
The bridge experiences occasional brief closures during very severe weather, such as the St. Jude storm of October 2013.

The design, manufacturing and installation of the bearings were carried out by the Swiss civil engineering firm Mageba.

Vibration issues, caused by several cables in the bridge moving under certain wind and temperature conditions, were combatted with the installation of compression spring dampers installed in pairs at the centre of the cables. Two of these dampers were equipped with laser gauges for ongoing monitoring. Testing, development and installation of these spring dampers was carried out by specialists European Springs.

Peberholm

The bridge joins Drogden tunnel on the artificial island of Peberholm (Pepper Islet). The Danes chose the name to complement the natural island of Saltholm (Salt Islet) just to the north.

Drogden Tunnel

It comprises a  immersed tube plus  entry tunnels at each end. The tube tunnel is made from 20 prefabricated reinforced concrete segments – the largest in the world at 55,000 tonnes each – interconnected in a trench dug in the seabed. Two tubes in the tunnel carry railway tracks, two carry roads and a small fifth tube is provided for emergencies. The tubes are arranged side by side.

Rail transport

The rail link is operated jointly by the Swedish Transport Administration (Trafikverket) and the Danish railway infrastructure manager Banedanmark. Passenger train service is commissioned by Skånetrafiken and the Danish Civil Aviation and Railway Authority (Trafikstyrelsen) under the Øresundståg brand, with Transdev and DSB being the current operators. A series of new dual-voltage trains was developed, linking the Copenhagen area with Malmö and southern Sweden as far as Gothenburg and Kalmar. SJ operates X2000 trains over the bridge, with connections to Gothenburg and Stockholm. Copenhagen Airport at Kastrup has its own railway station close to the western bridgehead. Since December 2022, trains operate typically every 15 minutes during the day, reducing to once an hour during the night in both directions. Additional Øresundstrains are operated at rush hour. Freight trains also use the crossing.

There were challenges related to the difference in electrification and signalling between the Danish and Swedish railway networks. The solution chosen is to switch the electrical system from Swedish 15 kV, 16.7 Hz to Danish 25 kV, 50 Hz before the eastern bridgehead at Lernacken in Sweden. The line is signalled according to the standard Swedish system across the length of the bridge. On Peberholm the line switches to Danish signalling, which continues into the tunnel. There is no way of changing between a locomotive for Danish standard and one for Swedish standard. All rail vehicles using the bridge must be custom made for the standards of both countries.

Trains run on the left in Sweden, and on the right in Denmark. Initially the switch was made at Malmö Central Station, a terminus at that time. After the 2010 inauguration of the Malmö City Tunnel connection, a tunnel was built at Burlöv, north of Malmö, where the two southbound tracks cross over the northbound pair. The railway in Malmö thus uses the Danish standard.

Border checks
With both Sweden and Denmark being part of the Nordic Passport Union since the 1950s, border controls between the two countries have been abolished for decades and travellers can normally move freely across the Øresund Bridge. In 2001, both countries also joined the Schengen area, and since then the abolishment of border controls is primarily regulated by European Union law, more specifically the Schengen acquis.

However, in November 2015, during the European migrant crisis, Sweden introduced temporary border controls at the border to Denmark in accordance with the provisions of the Schengen acquis on the reintroduction of temporary internal border controls. As such, travellers into Sweden from Denmark (but not travellers into Denmark from Sweden) must show a valid passport or national ID card (citizens of EU/EEA countries) or passport and entry visa (if required) for nationals of other non-EU/EEA countries. The move marked a break with 60 years of border control free travel between the Nordic countries. In January 2016, these border measures were extended by a special carriers’ liability, forcing carriers (such as bus, train and ferry companies) to check the identity of all passengers from Denmark before they boarded a bus, train or ferry to Sweden. These checks were enforced by a fine of SEK 50,000 as punishment for serving those without such identity documents. This led to the enforcement of checks by private security guards at, for instance, the rail station in Kastrup airport in Denmark, an unpopular move with passengers, due to the delays imposed.

In May 2017, Sweden removed the carriers' liability, but the ordinary border controls carried out by the Swedish Police Authority remained on the Swedish side of the Øresund Bridge. In accordance with the Schengen Borders Code, these border controls are only allowed for a period of six months at a time, and therefore have to be renewed twice a year.

Costs and benefits

The cost for the Øresund Connection, including motorway and railway connections on land, was DKK 30.1 billion (~€4.0 billion) according to the 2000 year price index, with the cost of the bridge expected in 2003 to be recouped by 2037. In 2006, Sweden began work on the Malmö City Tunnel, a SEK 9.45 billion connection with the bridge that was completed in December 2010.

The connection will be entirely user-financed. The owner company is owned half by the Danish state and half by the Swedish state. This owner company has taken loans guaranteed by the governments to finance the connection and the user fees are its only income. After the increase in traffic, these fees are enough to pay the interest and begin repaying the loans, which is expected to take about 30 years.

Taxpayers have paid for neither the bridge nor the tunnel, but tax money has been used for the land connections. On the Danish side, the land connection has domestic benefits, mainly to connect the airport to the railway network. The Malmö City Tunnel has the benefit of connecting the southern part of the inner city to the rail network and allowing many more trains to and from Malmö.

According to The Öresund Committee, the bridge has made a national economic gain of DKK 57 billion, or SEK 78 billion SEK (~€8.41 billion) on both sides of the strait by increased commuting and lower commuting expense. The gain is estimated to be SEK 6.5 billion per year but this could be increased to 7.7 billion by removing the three biggest obstacles to integration and mobility, the two largest being that non-EU nationals in Sweden are not allowed to work in Denmark and that many professional qualifications and merits are not mutually recognised.

A 2021 study found that the bridge led to an increase in innovation in Malmö. The key mechanism appears to be that high-skilled workers were drawn to Malmö. A 2022 study found that the bridge caused an increase of 13.5% in the average wage of workers in the region, as the bridge expanded the size of the labor market.

Cultural references
The Øresund Bridge gave its name to the Nordic noir television series The Bridge, as the series was set in the region around the bridge.
When Malmö hosted the Eurovision Song Contest in 2013, the Øresund Bridge was used as a symbol for the connection between Sweden and the rest of Europe.
It was the inspiration behind the 2014 song "Walk Me to the Bridge" by Manic Street Preachers from their album Futurology.

Environmental effects
The underwater parts of the bridge have become covered in marine organisms and act as an artificial reef.

See also

 Fehmarn Belt Fixed Link
 HH Tunnel, a proposed second Øresund fixed link connecting Helsingør and Helsingborg
 List of bridge–tunnels
 List of road-rail bridges
 Old Little Belt Bridge (opened 1935) and New Little Belt Bridge (opened 1970)
 Øresund Region
 Øresundsmetro
 Johor–Singapore Causeway – between Malaysia and Singapore
 Mumbai Trans Harbour Link.

References

External links

 Official English website
 
 
 
 Øresund bridge project information from Road Traffic Technology
 Impossible Bridges: Denmark to Sweden (MegaStructures documentary, 2006)
 Video on Arup's website and on Youtube showing Arup Legends: Jorgen Nissen
 Live WebCam

 
Cable-stayed bridges in Denmark
Cable-stayed bridges in Sweden
Double-decker bridges
Road bridges in Denmark
Railway bridges in Denmark
Railway bridges in Sweden
Toll bridges in Denmark
Road-rail bridges
Bridge–tunnels in Europe
International bridges
Bridges completed in 2000
Buildings and structures in Copenhagen
Buildings and structures in Malmö
Scania
Viaducts
Connections across the Baltic Sea
Denmark–Sweden border crossings
2000 establishments in Denmark
2000 establishments in Sweden
Cross-sea bridges in Europe
Railway tunnels in Denmark
Toll bridges in Sweden